Gabriel Sphrantzes was a Byzantine aristocrat and courtier.

Very little is known about him. He was possibly the son of Maria Sphrantzaina, daughter of John Petraliphas and a sister-in-law of Michael II Komnenos Doukas, Despot of Epirus. She was widowed in 1257 and then remarried, first to the governor of Arbanon Constantine Chabaron, and finally to Filippo Chinardo, the Sicilian admiral of Corfu. At some point he served as parakoimomenos of the great seal to Emperor Michael VIII Palaiologos (r. 1259–1282), but was blinded by him sometime before 1280. He is last mentioned in that year, when he accompanied the emperor to Nicomedia, along with his cousin John Doukas.

References

Sources
 

13th-century Byzantine people
Parakoimomenoi
Gabriel